Pullaiah or Pullayya (Telugu: పుల్లయ్య) is an Indian name.
 Pullaiah Banjer is a village in Kalluru mandal, Khammam district in Andhra Pradesh, India
 C. Pullaiah (1898–1967), Indian film director
 Darur Pullaiah (fl. 1970s–1980s), Indian politician.
 P. Pullaiah (1911–1985), Indian film producer and director
 sollige.pullaiah      (2004-), Founder of puli talks (youtube channel)

Masculine given names